Après une lecture du Dante: Fantasia quasi Sonata (French for After a Reading of Dante: Fantasia quasi Sonata; also known as the Dante Sonata) is a piano sonata in one movement, completed by Hungarian composer Franz Liszt in 1849. It was first published in 1856 as part of the second volume of his Années de pèlerinage (Years of Pilgrimage). This work of program music was inspired by the reading of Victor Hugo's poem “Après un lecture du Dante” (1836).

Background 

The Dante Sonata was originally a small piece entitled Fragment after Dante, consisting of two thematically related movements, which Liszt composed in the late 1830s. He gave the first public performance in Vienna in November 1839. When he settled in Weimar in 1849, he revised the work along with others in the volume, and gave it its present title derived from Victor Hugo's own work of the same name. It was published in 1858 as part of Années de pèlerinage.

Composition 

The piece is divided into two main subjects. The first, a chromatic theme in D minor, typifies the wailing of souls in Hell. D minor is a common key for music relating to death, as evidenced by Liszt's Totentanz and the statue scene of Wolfgang Mozart's Don Giovanni. The first theme also heavily uses the tritone (augmented 4th or diminished 5th); this interval was known as the Devil's interval (or "Devil in music") and further reinforces the hellish imagery. The second theme is a beatific chorale in F-sharp major, derived from the first, which represents the joy of those in Heaven. The key is also symbolic here, being the signature for other uplifting works of Liszt's, including Benediction of God in Solitude (part of Harmonies poétiques et religieuses) and Les Jeux d'eaux à la Villa d'Este (Années de pèlerinage, vol. 3, no. 4). The secondary theme may also represent Beatrice, as it is interspersed within chromatic areas, similar to the character's appearances in hell. The piece ends with a rapid chromatic octave section that when played at speed seems to split into three distinct themes, reflecting the three heads of Satan in Dante's Inferno.

See also 
 Dante Symphony
 Piano Sonata in B minor (Liszt)

References

External links 
 
 Années de Pèlerinage sheet music download

Compositions by Franz Liszt
Piano sonatas
1849 compositions
Liszt
Death in music
Music based on Inferno (Dante)
The Devil in classical music